The discography of the German electronic musician ATB consists of 10 studio albums, 11 compilation album, 2 EPs, 36 singles, six video albums and 28 music videos. While ATB is mostly known in the world for his hit singles "9pm (Till I Come)" and "Don't Stop!", both of which were released from his first 1999 studio album Movin' Melodies, he still remains quite popular both at home and Eastern Europe including Poland where his studio albums Trilogy and Future Memories have gone Platinum.

Albums

Studio albums

Compilation albums

The DJ in the Mix

Sunset Beach DJ Sessions

Extended plays

Singles

Videography

Home videos
2003: Addicted to Music
2004: No Silence (included with No Silence – Special Edition)
2005: Seven Years (1998–2005)
2006: Live in Poznań
2007: Trilogy (included with the Trilogy – The Platinum Edition)
2009: Future Memories (included in Future Memories – Limited Edition)

Music videos
(from Movin' Melodies)
1998: 9pm (Till I Come) (feat. Yolanda Rivera)
1999: Don't Stop! (feat. Yolanda Rivera)
1999: Killer (with Woody van Eyden & Drue Williams)
(from Two Worlds)
2000: The Summer
2000: The Fields of Love (feat. York)
2001: Let U Go (feat. Roberta Harrison) 
(from "Dedicated")
2001: Hold You (feat. Roberta Harrison) 
2002: You're Not Alone (feat. Roberta Harrison) 
(from Addicted to Music)
2003: I Don't Wanna Stop (feat. Roberta Harrison)
2003: Long Way Home (feat. Roberta Harrison)
2004: I Don't Wanna Stop (Original Edit) (feat. Roberta Harrison)
(from No Silence)
2004: Marrakech (feat. Tiff Lacey)
2004: Ecstasy (feat. Tiff Lacey)
(from Seven Years: 1998–2005)
2005: Believe in Me (also as "A&T Remix" and "Rockamerica Remix") (feat. Jan Löchel)
2005: Humanity (feat. Tiff Lacey)
2005: Let U Go (Reworked) (feat. Jan Löchel)
(from Trilogy)
2007: Renegade (also as "A&T Remix Edit") (feat. Heather Nova)
2007: Feel Alive (feat. Jan Löchel)
(from Future Memories)
2009: What About Us (feat. Jan Löchel)
2009: L.A. Nights
2009: Behind (feat. Flanders)
(from The DJ 5 in the Mix)
2010: 9 PM Reloaded
(from Sunset Beach DJ Session)
2010: Could You Believe
(from Distant Earth)
2011: Gold (feat. Jansoon)
2011: Apollo Road (feat. Dash Berlin)
2011: Move On (feat. Jansoon)
(from The DJ 6 in the Mix)
2011: Twisted Love (feat. Cristina Soto)
(from Sunset Beach DJ Session 2)
2012: Never Give Up (feat. Ramona Nerra)
2012: In and Out of Love (with Rudee & Ramona Nerra)
(from Contact)
2014: Face to Face (feat. Stanfour)
2014: When It Ends It Starts Again (feat. Sean Ryan)
2014: Raging Bull (with Boss & Swan)

(others)

2018: Body 2 Body (feat. Conor Matthews & LAUR)
2021: Your Love (9PM)  (with Topic and A7S)

Other work and productions

Singles
Sequential One (with Ulrich Pöppelbaum)
1994: "Back 2 Unity"
1995: "Happy Feelings"
1996: "Pump Up The Bass"
1996: "My Love Is Hot" (feat. Morpha)
1997: "I Wanna Make U..."/"Get Down" (feat. Morpha)
1997: "Dreams" (feat. Morpha)
1998: "Imagination" (feat. Morpha & Barry Mullen-Pascher)
1998: "Inspiration Vibes"
1999: "Angels"/"Moments In Atmosphere"

Inferno DJs (with Woody van Eyden, Kosmonova, Kevin C. Cox & Bass Bumpers)
1998 "Tower Inferno"
1999 "Why Don't You"
Love & Fate (with Woody van Eyden)
1996: "Love And Fate"
1997: "Deeper Love"
1998: "Love And Fate Part II"
Re-Flex (with Woody van Eyden, Ulrich Pöppelbaum, Tom Mountain, Spyker Mike & MPT)
2000: "Lui"
2000: "Ubap"
2001: "Babadeng"
2002: "Headbangers Go"
2004: "Abdulle"
2007: "Lui 2007"
U.K.W. (with Woody van Eyden, Ulrich Pöppelbaum & Ray Corn)
1999: "Hypnotic"
2000 "Electric Love"
Other aliases
1993: "Deep In Your Soul" (with Thomas Kukula as Space Corp 1)
1993: "Trance Music Was Born" (with Thomas Kukula as All In Vain)
1995: "Na Na Na" (with Stefan Heinemann as Beatmen)
1995: "Move On Groove One" (with Woody van Eyden as Ironic Beat)
1998: "Guitano"/"Beach Vibes" (with Woody van Eyden as E.F.F.)
2001: "Tanztablette" (with Alex M.O.R.P.H. as Unit 2)
2004: "Union" (with Kai Tracid as Farrago)

Productions or co-productions for other artists
1995: DJ Jacques O. feat. Jennifer Boyce – "Kiss Me"
1996: Bob Doope – "A Wonderful Time (Up There)"
1996: Joan Robinson – "Work It Out"
1998: Woody van Eyden – "Freaky Wings"
1998: Woody van Eyden – "Fiesta in Mallorca"
1998: Woody van Eyden – "Time Now"
1999: Woody van Eyden – "Get Ready"
2000: Woody van Eyden – "Feels Like Flyin'"

Promotional singles
Sequential One (with Ulrich Pöppelbaum, additionally co-produced by Thomas Kukula (1993) and Woody van Eyden (1996–1998))
1993: "Let Me Hear You"
1993: "Dance"/"Raving"
1994: "Here We Go Again"
1995: "Never Start To Stop"
SQ-1
1999: "Can You Feel..."
1999: "Music So Wonderful"
2000: "One, Two, Three"
2001: "Dance (2001 Version)"
2002: "Balare" (with Roberto Mirto & RuDee)
Danny Lee
1996: "(Here Comes) The Music"
Naughty A.T.
1996: "Suck Me"

Remixes

References

External links
 

Discographies of German artists
Electronic music discographies